Stenygra contracta is a species of beetle in the family Cerambycidae. It was described by Pascoe in 1862.

References

Hexoplonini
Beetles described in 1862